In mathematics, a Verlinde algebra is a finite-dimensional associative algebra introduced by , with a basis of elements φλ corresponding to primary fields of a rational two-dimensional conformal field theory, whose structure constants N describe fusion of primary fields.

Verlinde formula

In terms of the modular S-matrix, the fusion coefficients are given by

Twisted equivariant K-theory

If G is a compact Lie group, there is a rational conformal field theory whose primary fields correspond to the representations λ of some fixed level of loop group of G. For this special case  showed that the Verlinde algebra can be identified with twisted equivariant K-theory of G.

See also

Fusion rules

Notes

References

MathOverflow discussion with a number of references. 

Representation theory
Conformal field theory